The Riverside Memorial Chapel is a Jewish funeral home chain with their main facility at 180 West 76th Street on the Upper West Side of Manhattan, New York City.
The company is now owned by Service Corporation International.

History
Riverside Memorial Chapel was founded as Meyers Livery Stable in 1897 by Louis Meyers on Norfolk Street on the Lower East Side of Manhattan. In 1905, the business was relocated to 54 East 109th Street and the name was changed to Meyers Undertakers. In 1916, the business was relocated to 228 Lenox Avenue (at 122nd Street) in Harlem and the name changed to Meyers & Company. In 1926, they moved to 180 West 76th Street and Amsterdam Avenue on the Upper West Side and built a large four story chapel. In 1933, they divided into two separate companies, Riverside Memorial Chapel and Parkwest Chapels. The funeral company was headed by Charles Rosenthal. They expanded thereafter to Miami, Florida (1935); Brooklyn (1938); the Bronx (1940); and Westchester County, New York (1950). The company, then owned by the founder's grandson, Edward Rosenthal, expanded via acquisitions acquiring the Frank E. Campbell Funeral Chapel (1948), the Universal Funeral Chapel (1955); and the Walter B. Cooke Chapel (1957) to become the largest funeral company in the United States. In 1958, Rosenthal retired and ceded control to his son-in-law Steve Ross. In 1961, the company was merged with the Kinney Parking Company (then, renamed as Kinney Service Corporation) and taken public. In June 1971, Riverside Memorial Chapel was purchased by Service Corporation International.

Notable funerals

 Alvin Achenbaum
 Joey Adams
 Bert Berns
 J. Sidney Bernstein
 Meyer Bloomfield
 Grace Borgenicht Brandt
 Julie Braun-Vogelstein
 Paula Danziger
 David Deutsch (ad executive)
 Simon Federbusch
 Arnold Fine
 Sidney Frank
 Louis D. Gibbs
 Madeline Lee Gilford
 Gilbert Gottfried
 Lazarus Joseph (1891–1966), NY State Senator and New York City Comptroller.
 Al Kelly
 Nat Lefkowitz
 Malvina Longfellow
 Lewis Merenstein
 Vivian Nathan
 Yehuda Nir
 Marni Nixon
 Maurice Paprin
 Henry G. Plitt
 Leopold Prince
 Joan Rivers
 Richard C. Ross
 Eric Siday
 Morton Sweig
 Jerome Toobin
 Sol Ullman
 Morris D. Waldman
 Hannah Weinstein

References

1897 establishments in New York City
American companies established in 1897
Companies based in New York City
Death care companies of the United States
Upper West Side
Former Time Warner subsidiaries